PinoRoad was a Chilean UCI Continental cycling team that existed only for the 2014 season.

2014 Roster

References

Cycling teams based in Chile
Cycling teams established in 2014
Cycling teams disestablished in 2014
UCI Continental Teams (America)
Defunct cycling teams